The Leech is a 2022 American holiday comedy horror film directed by Eric Pennycoff and starring Jeremy Gardner, Taylor Zaudtke and Graham Skipper.

Cast
Jeremy Gardner as Terry
Taylor Zaudtke as Lexi
Graham Skipper as Father David
Rigo Garay as Rigo

Release
The film premiered at the Chattanooga Film Festival on 23 June 2022.

Reception
Michelle Swope of the Daily Dead rated the film 4 stars out of 5, calling it "the obscenely fun, naughty Christmas horror comedy you didn’t know you needed." Mary Beth McAndrews of Dread Central rated the film 3.5 stars out of 5, writing "‘The Leech’ is a sin-filled stocking stuffed with chaos, whiskey, cocaine, and dildos. And yet, it still could have been weirder."

References

External links
 
 

2022 horror films
2020s English-language films
2022 comedy films
2022 comedy horror films
American comedy horror films